Medical Forces Command is the specialist corps in the Ukrainian Armed Forces responsible for providing medical services to military personnel and their families. At the beginning of February 2020, the command was established, providing for the unification of the medical service under the leadership of the Commander of the Medical Forces, who in turn is subordinate to the Commander-in-Chief of the Armed Forces of Ukraine. Four operational commands will be created within Medical Forces Command, totalling to 134 people.

Commanders
 Major General Igor Khomenko (2020-2021)
 Major General Tetiana Ostashchenko (since 2021)

References

External links
 КОМАНДУВАННЯ МЕДИЧНИХ СИЛ ТРЕТЄ ЗА ЧИСЕЛЬНІСТЮ В ЗСУ

Medical units and formations
Military units and formations of Ukraine
Military units and formations established in 2020